Win Far 161 (Chinese: 穩發161號) is a Taiwanese fishing vessel captured by Somali pirates on 6 April 2009 near the Seychelles. The ship was released on 11 February 2010 after a ransom was paid, and after the ship had been used as a mother ship in the Maersk Alabama hijacking. Two of the 30 crew had died during their time held hostage, due to malnutrition and neglect by their Somali captors. The ship was likely captured by Abduwali Muse.

After negotiation, the crew and the vessel were released by the pirates on 11 February 2010, and returned to Kaohsiung, Taiwan on 5 March 2010.

References

Piracy in Somalia
Fishing vessels
Ships of Taiwan